Apolipoprotein O also known as protein FAM121B is a protein that in humans is encoded by the APOO gene.  APOO is a member of the apolipoprotein family.

The human, apolipoprotein O is a 198 amino acids protein that contains a 23 amino acids long signal peptide. The apoprotein is secreted by a microsomal triglyceride transfer protein (MTTP)-dependent mechanism, probably as a VLDL-associated protein that is subsequently transferred to HDL. Apolipoprotein O is the first chondroitine sulphate chain containing apolipoprotein.

Apolipoproteins are proteins that binds to lipids. Members of this family promote cholesterol efflux from macrophage cells. They are present in various lipoprotein complexes, including HDL, LDL and VLDL.

References

External links

Further reading

Protein families